Alexander Stark (born 1974) is a biochemist and computational biologist working on the regulation of gene expression in development. He is a senior scientist at the Research Institute of Molecular Pathology (IMP) at the Vienna Biocenter and adjunct professor of the Medical University of Vienna.

Early life and education

Alexander Stark grew up in Baden-Württemberg, Germany. He studied biochemistry at the University of Tübingen, and graduated with a diploma in biochemistry in 2000. In 2001, he started to do research for doctoral studies in the group of Robert B. (Rob) Russell at the European Molecular Biology Laboratory (EMBL) and obtained his doctorate from the University of Cologne in 2004. Stark remained at EMBL for one more year as a bridging postdoc.

Career

In 2005, Stark became a postdoctoral researcher in the groups of Eric S. Lander and Manolis Kellis at the Broad Institute of MIT and Harvard University and the MIT Computer Science and Artificial Intelligence Laboratory (CSAIL) in Boston, USA. His postdoctoral research was supported by EMBO, HFSP, and the Schering Foundation.

In 2008, Stark became group leader at the Research Institute of Molecular Pathology (IMP) in Vienna and was promoted to senior scientist in 2015. He was made adjunct professor of the Medical University of Vienna in 2017.

Research
Alexander Stark studies the regulation of gene expression in response to developmental or environmental stimuli to learn how transcription and transcriptional networks define cellular and developmental programs.

More specifically, he investigates how transcription is regulated at the level of enhancer and core-promoter DNA elements, and the transcription factor and cofactor proteins that mediate transcription activation. He uses genome-wide functional assays, bioinformatics, and mass spectrometry, and develops innovative reporter assays (such as STARR-seq) that provide direct functional readouts.

Some of Stark's most cited publications include Principles of MicroRNA- Target Recognition, bantam Encodes a Developmentally Regulated microRNA that Controls Cell Proliferation and Regulates the Proapoptotic Gene hid in Drosophila, and Histone modifications at human enhancers reflect global cell-type-specific gene expression.

Awards and achievements

Alexander Stark was selected EMBO Young Investigator in 2012; announced as "highly cited researcher" by Thomson Reuters in 2014 and elected member of EMBO in 2015.

Among other grants and fellowships, Stark was awarded a starting grant of the European Research Council (ERC) in 2009, and a consolidator grant of the ERC in 2015. He is on the editorial boards of Genes & Development and Molecular Systems Biology.

References

External links
 Alexander Stark's lab

Members of the European Molecular Biology Organization
Living people
1974 births
European Research Council grantees